Bronson Crocker Howard (October 7, 1842 – August 4, 1908) was an American dramatist.

Biography
Howard was born in Detroit where his father Charles Howard was Mayor in 1849.  He prepared for college at New Haven, Conn., but instead of entering Yale he turned to Journalism in New York. From 1867 to 1872 he worked on several newspapers, among them the Evening Mail and the Tribune. As early as 1864 he had written a dramatic piece (Fantine) which was played in Detroit. His first important play was Saratoga, produced by Augustin Daly in 1870. It was very successful and became the first of a long series of pieces which gave Mr. Howard a foremost position among American playwrights.

He married a sister of Sir Charles Wyndham, the English actor, and he had homes in New Rochelle, New York and London, England where some of his plays were no less popular than in America. Bronson Howard was a member of the American Academy of Arts and Letters.

The English newspaper The Yorkshire Evening Post reported in 1894: Mr Bronson Howard, the American playwright, calls the first stage of his work, "the smoking stage." He smokes for weeks, even months, only making notes.

He died, aged 65, in Avon-by-the-Sea, New Jersey, where he had gone to regain his strength.

Works
Among his other best-known plays are:  
 The Banker's Daughter (1878)  
 Old Love Letters (1878)  
 Young Mrs. Winthrop (1882)  
 One of our Girls (1885)  
 The Henrietta (1887; revived in 1913 as The New Henrietta)  
 Shenandoah (1889)  
 Aristocracy (1892)

In 1899 he collaborated with Brander Matthews in Peter Stuyvesant.

The Social Pirates, series of stories adapted into a film series

References

Literature
 Moses, M.J. (1911). The American Dramatist. Boston: Little, Brown & Company.

External links

 Bronson Howard papers, 1852-1895, held by the Billy Rose Theatre Division, New York Public Library for the Performing Arts
 
 
Bronson Howard portraits(New York Public Library, Billy Rose collection)

Writers from Detroit
People from Avon-by-the-Sea, New Jersey
Writers from New Rochelle, New York
American fantasy writers
1842 births
1908 deaths
American male novelists
American male dramatists and playwrights
19th-century American novelists
19th-century American dramatists and playwrights
19th-century American male writers
Novelists from New York (state)
Novelists from Michigan
Members of the American Academy of Arts and Letters